Veera Kannadiga is a 2004 Indian Kannada-language action drama film starring Puneeth Rajkumar and Anita Hassanandani directed by debutant Meher Ramesh. The film was written by Puri Jagannadh who simultaneously made in Telugu as Andhrawala starring Jr. NTR. The movie was a commercial success.

Plot 
A man protects a slum and strives to keep its inhabitants safe from negative elements as he aims to avenge his father's death against the criminals who killed him, in which, he eventually succeeds.

Cast 
Puneeth Rajkumar as Munna and Shankar
Anita Hassanandani as Chitra
Kaushalya
Laya
Sayaji Shinde as Bade Mia
Riyaz Khan
Avinash
Besant Ravi
Bullet Prakash
Karthik Sharma

Production 
Meher Ramesh who assisted Puri Jagannadh made his directorial debut with this film. The film was started on 22 August 2003 and was completed by 25 December.

Soundtrack

Reception 
Viggy wrote "Veera Kannadiga looks luxurious but for Kannadigas, is nothing but an Andhra Meal!". The reviewer for Deccan Herald wrote that Puneeth Rajkumar "in a double role as father and son puts up a convincing show." He concluding writing, "The film’s main focus is on the gallantry of Kannadigas. Music by Chakri will appeal to the youngsters but there are too many songs. The movie will be an enjoyable fare for the lovers of comedy." The movie completed 100 days.

References

External links 
 

2004 films
2004 action drama films
2000s Kannada-language films
Films set in Mumbai
Films shot in Mumbai
Indian films about revenge
Indian multilingual films
2000s masala films
Indian action drama films
Films scored by Chakri
Indian gangster films
Films set in 2003
Films set in the 1970s
2004 multilingual films
Films directed by Meher Ramesh